This is a non-exhaustive (incomplete) list of wildlife magazines.

Magazines on ornithology and bird-watching can be found in list of ornithology journals.

In English 
 Australian Wildlife, quarterly magazine of the Wildlife Preservation Society of Australia
 BBC Wildlife, British monthly, since 1963
 Birds & Blooms, US, bi-monthly
 British Wildlife, British, six times per year, since 1989
 Flamingo - Bulletin of Gujarat Birds, quarterly newsletter of the Bird Conservation Society of Gujarat
 National Wildlife Magazine, publication of the National Wildlife Federation
 Swara, published by the East Africa Wildlife Society
 Zoobooks
 The Zoologist, monthly, an expansion of The Entomologist in 1843, merged with British Birds in 1916

In French
 La Salamandre

In Norwegian
 Villmarksliv

References

Wildlife
Wildlife